The discography of Top Dawg Entertainment, an American independent record label, consists of 26 studio albums, 2 compilation album, 6 extended plays (EP), 17 mixtapes, 37 singles and 84 music videos. Overall the label has sold more than three million records in the US alone.

Studio albums
The following is a list of albums released through Top Dawg Entertainment.  Additional record label involvement is also specified.

Compilation albums

EPs

Mixtapes

Singles

References

External links

Discographies of American record labels
Hip hop discographies